Yaroslav Dashkevych (1926-2010) was Ukrainian historian, archaeographer, armenologist. He wrote over 1700 scientific and publicist works. Dashkevych was a representative of Hrushevsky school of history and a victim of Stalinist terror. He was a Doctor of Historical Sciences.

Biography
Dashkevych was born in Lviv in a family of war veterans. His father Roman Dashkevych was a lawyer and later a general-khorunzhyi (general-ensign) of the Ukrainian People's Army and his mother Olena Stepaniv was a teacher and later chotar (captain) of the Ukrainian Galician Army.

After graduating the Lviv Academic Gymnasium in 1944, until 1949 Yaroslav Dashkevych studied at several institutes (Lviv Medical University, Lviv University, and Gubkin Russian State University of Oil and Gas). During his studying at Lviv University, in 1944-49 he was a librarian and bibliographer at the Stefanyk National Science Library.

In December of 1949 Dashkevych was arrested by the Soviet Ministry of State Security (MGB) agents. Same year there was arrested and his mother. In 1950 Dashkevych was convicted to 10 years of imprisonment and between 1949-56 served his time in number of transitional jails in Lviv, Kharkiv, Petropavlovsk (today Petropavl in Kazakhstan) and couple of correctional labor camps in Spassk and Karaganda.

After being freed in 1956, Dashkevych returned to Lviv and in 1957 was hired as a bibliographer to the Lviv Institute of Social Sciences of the Academy of Sciences of the Ukrainian SSR (today, Krypiakevych Institute of Ukrainian Studies) where he worked until 1966. While working at the institute, he defended his candidate thesis on the subject "Armenian colonies in Ukraine in sources and literature of 15th-19th centuries" in the Yerevan Institute of History of the Academy of Sciences of the Armenian SSR. In 1967-72 Dashkevych worked as a senior research fellow at the Museum of ethnography and arts industries of the Academy of Sciences of the Ukrainian SSR in Lviv. In 1973 he was a head of department of auxiliary historical disciplines. In 1974-78 Dashkevych worked as a senior research fellow at the Central State Historical Archive of Ukraine in Lviv. From 1978 to 1990 he remained unemployed.

With the crumbling down Soviet Empire (see Revolutions of 1989 and dissolution of the Soviet Union), in 1990-91 Dashkevych was a head of Lviv branch of the Archaeographic Commission of the Academy of Sciences of the Ukrainian SSR which later transformed into Hrushevsky Institute of archaeography and sources studies of the National Academy of Sciences of Ukraine. In 1993 he became a leading research fellow of the Krymskyi Institute of Eastern Studies of the National Academy of Sciences of Ukraine. Since 1990 Dashkevych was a head of the Commission of Eastern Studies of the Shevchenko Scientific Society and since 1991 – member of the Shevchenko Scientific Society presidium and a head of historical and philosophic section of the society. In 1991 he became a dean of the Lviv University department of Eastern Studies.

Works
 Словник польських скорочень. (Dictionary of Polish abbreviations). Kyiv, 1959
 Армянские колонии на Украине в источниках и литературе XV–XIX веков (Историографический очерк). [Armenian colonies in Ukraine in sources and literature of 15th-19th centuries (Historical essay)] Yerevan, 1962
 Украинско-армянские связи в XVII веке: Сборник документов. [Ukrainian-Armenian relations in 17th century: Collection of documents] Kyiv, 1969
 A Turkish Document in Ukrainian from the Mid-sixteenth Century: On the Origin of the Ukrainian Cossacks. "Harvard Ukrainian Studies", 1977, vol. 1, № 1
 Древняя Русь и Армения в общественно-политических связях XI–XIII вв. (Источники исследования темы). У кн.: Древнейшие государства на территории СССР: Материалы и исследования (1982 г.). [Ancient Rus and Armenia in social-political relations of 11th-13th centuries (Sources of researched thesis). Ref: The most ancient states on territory of the USSR: Materials and research (1982)] Moscow, 1984
 К средневековой сфрагистике армян Украины. В кн.: Banber Matenadarani (Вестник Матенадарана), т. 15. [To the Medieval sphragistics of Armenians in Ukraine. Ref: Banber Matenadarani (Matenadarani Herald)] Yerevan, 1986
 Русь і Вірменія. Конфесійні та культурні контакти IX – першої половини XIII століть. [Rus and Armenia. Confessional and cultural contacts of 11-13 centuries]. "Shevchenko Scientific Society Notes", 1993, т. 225
 Україна вчора і нині: Нариси, виступи, есе. [Ukraine yesterday and today: Overviews, speeches and essays] Kyiv, 1993
 Ясир з України (XV – перша половина XVII ст.) як історико-демографічна проблема. [Yesir in Ukraine (15th-17th centuries) as historical and demographic problem] "Ukrainian Archaeographic Almanac: Nova seria", 1993, Ed. 2
 Русь і Сирія: взаємозв'язки VIII–XIV століть. [Rus and Syria: mutual relations of 8th-14th centuries] "Shevchenko Scientific Society Notes", 1994, т. 228
 Боротьба з Грушевським та його школою у Львівському університеті за радянських часів. В кн.: Михайло Грушевський і львівська історична школа: Матеріали конференції (Львів, 24–25 жовтня 1994 р.). [Struggle against Hrushevsky and his history school in Lviv University during the Soviet period. Ref: Mykhailo Hrushevsky and Lvivian history school: Conference materials (Lviv, 24-24 October 1994)] New-York–Lviv, 1995
 Павло Тетеря, незрозумілий гетьман (1662–1665). [Pavlo Teteria, obscure hetman (1662-1665)] "Neopalyma kupyna", 1995, # 1/2
 Україна–Іспанія–Португалія у XVII ст.: контактні зв'язки. В кн.: Україна XVII ст. між Заходом і Сходом Європи: Матеріали 1-го Українсько-італійського симпозіуму (13–16 вересня 1994 р.). [Ukraine–Spain–Portugal in 17th century: contact relations. Ref: Ukraine of 17th century between West and East Europe: Materials of the 1st Ukrainian–Italian symposium (13-16 September 1994)] Kyiv–Venice, 1996
 Постмодернізм та українська історична наука. [Post-modernism and Ukrainian Historical Science] "Ukrayinski problemy", 1999, # 1/2
 Вірменія і Україна [Збірник наукових статей та рецензій, 1954–1989 рр.]. [Armenia and Ukraine (Collection of scientific articles and reviews) 1954-1989] Lviv–New-York, 2001
 Шотландія і Україна, або про межі історичного компаративізму. [Scotland and Ukraine, or about boundaries of historical comparativism] "Skhid-Z
 Dashkevych, Ya. How Moscow hijacked the history of Kyivan Rus’. (original). Universum. 2011.

References

External links
 "Writing a Factual History of Ukraine". The Ukrainian Week. 6 March 2011.
 Koval, Ya. Yaroslav Dashkevych: "By overcoming fear, we will finally reunite eastern and western Ukraine". The Day. 26 January 1999 (interview)
 "In Memory: Yaroslav Dashkevych". Kharkiv Human Rights Protection Group. 26 February 2010.
 Yas, O. Yaroslav Dashkevych. Encyclopedia of History of Ukraine.

1926 births
2010 deaths
People from Lwów Voivodeship
20th-century Ukrainian historians
Archaeographers
Gulag detainees
University of Lviv alumni
Ukrainian archivists
Academic staff of the University of Lviv
Members of the Shevchenko Scientific Society
Krymskyi Institute of Eastern Studies people
Burials at Lychakiv Cemetery